Al-Aqrūḑ is a sub-district located in the Al-Misrakh District, Taiz Governorate, Yemen. Al-Aqrūḑ had a population of 43,728 according to the 2004 census.

Villages
Aṣ-Ṣarim
Athanib
 Dabh
 Adhagag Dabh
 Ad-Dimna
 Al-ʿAmad
 Ḥamah al-Sufla
 Ḥamah al-ʿulia
 Al-Ḥajarin
 Al-Misar
 Ḥidah
 Al-Miḥdad
 Al-Akdan
 Al-Adhur
 Al-Aridhah
 Al-Shabilah
 Mukhirʿah
 al-Wajd
 Al-Khalal
 Ḥasat
 Shamar
 Al-Najadi
 Balʿan
 Hagmah
 Al-Makhʿaf
 Al-Aslaf
 Ḥisaan
 Hibah
 Kor
 Waraqah
 Ras al-Naqil
 Al-Ḥolagah
 Al-Modamah

References

Sub-districts in Al-Misrakh District